Emil Jannings (born Theodor Friedrich Emil Janenz, 23 July 1884 – 2 January 1950) was a Swiss-born German actor, popular in the 1920s in Hollywood. He was the first recipient of the Academy Award for Best Actor for his roles in The Last Command and The Way of All Flesh.

Jannings is best known for his collaborations with F. W. Murnau and Josef von Sternberg, including the 1930 film The Blue Angel (Der blaue Engel, with Marlene Dietrich. The Blue Angel was meant as a vehicle for Jannings to score a place for himself in the new medium of sound film, but Dietrich stole the show. Jannings later starred in a number of Nazi propaganda films, which made him unemployable as an actor after the defeat of Nazi Germany.

Childhood and youth
Jannings was born in Rorschach, Switzerland, the son of Emil Janenz, an American businessman from St. Louis, and his wife Margarethe (née Schwabe), originally from Germany. Jannings held German citizenship; while he was still young the family moved to Leipzig in the German Empire and further to Görlitz after the early death of his father.

Jannings ran away from school and went to sea. When he returned to Görlitz, his mother finally allowed him to begin a traineeship at the town state theatre, where he started his stage career. From 1901 onwards he worked with several theatre companies in Bremen, Nuremberg, Leipzig, Königsberg, and Glogau before joining the Deutsches Theater ensemble under director Max Reinhardt in Berlin. Permanently employed since 1915, Jannings met with playwright Karl Vollmöller, fellow actor Ernst Lubitsch, and photographer Frieda Riess. After World War I all were at the heart of Weimar Culture in 1920s Berlin. Jannings made his breakthrough in 1918 with his role as Judge Adam in Kleist's Broken Jug at the Schauspielhaus.

Career

Jannings was a theater actor who went into films, though he remained dissatisfied with the limited expressive possibilities in the silent era. Having signed a contract with the UFA production company, he starred in Die Augen der Mumie Ma (The Eyes of the Mummy, 1918) and Madame DuBarry (1919), both with Pola Negri in the main female part. He also performed in the 1922 film version of Othello and in F. W. Murnau's 1924 film The Last Laugh (Der Letzte Mann), as a proud but aged hotel doorman who is demoted to a restroom attendant. Jannings worked with Murnau on two other films; playing the title character in Tartuffe (Herr Tartüff, 1925), and as Mephistopheles in Faust (1926).

America
His increasing popularity enabled Jannings to sign an agreement with Paramount Pictures and eventually follow his acting colleagues Lubitsch and Negri to Hollywood. He started his career in 1927 with The Way of All Flesh directed by Victor Fleming (now lost) and in the following year performed in Josef von Sternberg's The Last Command. In 1929, Jannings won the first Best Actor Oscar for his work in both films. He and Sternberg also cooperated in Street of Sin (1928), though they actually differed about Jannings' acting in front of the camera.

His Hollywood career came to an end with the advent of talkies as his thick German accent was difficult to understand. His dialogue was initially dubbed by another actor in the part-talkie The Patriot (1928) directed by Ernst Lubitsch, although Jannings' own voice was restored after he objected. Returning to Europe, he starred opposite Marlene Dietrich in the 1930 film The Blue Angel, which was filmed simultaneously in English with its German version Der blaue Engel.

According to Susan Orlean, author of Rin Tin Tin: The Life and The Legend, Jannings was not actually the winner of the first best actor vote, but the runner-up. While researching her book, Orlean thought she discovered that it was in fact Rin Tin Tin, the German Shepherd dog, one of the biggest movie stars of his time, who won the vote. The Academy, however, worried about not being taken seriously if they gave the first Oscar to a dog, chose to award the Oscar to the human runner-up.

In 1960, Jannings was posthumously honored with a star on the Hollywood Walk of Fame at 1630 Vine Street for his contribution to motion pictures.

Nazi Germany

After the Nazi seizure of power in 1933, Jannings continued his career in the service of Nazi cinema. In Nazi Germany, he starred in several films which were intended to promote Nazism, particularly the Führerprinzip by presenting unyielding historical characters, such as Der alte und der junge König (The Old and the Young King 1934), Der Herrscher (The Ruler 1937) directed by Veit Harlan, Robert Koch (1939), Ohm Krüger (Uncle Kruger, 1941) and Die Entlassung (Bismarck's Dismissal, 1942). He also performed in his famed role in The Broken Jug directed by Gustav Ucicky. Minister of Propaganda Joseph Goebbels named Jannings an "Artist of the State" (Staatsschauspieler)

The shooting of his last film Wo ist Herr Belling? was aborted when troops of the Allied Powers entered Germany in Spring 1945. Jannings reportedly carried his Oscar statuette with him as proof of his former association with Hollywood. However, his active role in Nazi propaganda meant that he was subject to denazification, effectively ending his career.

In the same period Dietrich became a US citizen and an influential anti-Nazi activist, spending much of the war entertaining troops on the front lines and broadcasting on behalf of the OSS. Dietrich particularly loathed Jannings for his Nazi ties, and would later refer to her former co-star as a "ham".

Death

Jannings retired to Strobl near Salzburg, Austria, and became an Austrian citizen in 1947. He died in 1950, aged 65, from liver cancer. He is buried in the St. Wolfgang cemetery. His Best Actor Oscar is now on display at the Berlin Filmmuseum.

Marriages
Jannings was married four times. His first three marriages ended in divorce, his last with his death.  His last three marriages were to German stage and film actresses, Hanna Ralph, Lucie Höflich, and Gussy Holl. He had a daughter, Ruth-Maria (born 1920), from his first marriage to Lucy Höfling.

Cultural depictions
  portrayed a fictionalized version of Jannings in Inglourious Basterds (2009), directed by Quentin Tarantino. This fictional version of Jannings dies at the end of the film.
 In the 1972 film Cabaret, singer Sally Bowles (Liza Minnelli) finds herself at a high-society dinner party; she tries to impress someone at the table by suggesting that she is a friend of Emil Jannings.

Filmography

See also

 List of German-speaking Academy Award winners and nominees
 List of actors with Academy Award nominations

References

Further reading
 Frank Noack: Jannings. Belleville, München 2009 
 Carl Zuckmayer: Geheimreport. Hrsg. von Gunther Nickel und Johanna Schrön. Wallstein Verlag, Göttingen 2002, ; pp. 136–45
 Emil Jannings: Theater, Film – Das Leben und ich. Autobiographie. Berchtesgaden: Verlag Zimmer & Herzog, 1951. (posthumous)
 Herbert Ihering: Emil Jannings: Baumeister seines Lebens und seiner Filme. Heidelberg 1941

External links

Photographs of Emil Jannings

1884 births
1950 deaths
People from Rorschach, Switzerland
Nazi propagandists
German people of American descent
German people of Russian descent
German male film actors
German male silent film actors
Naturalised citizens of Austria
Volpi Cup for Best Actor winners
20th-century German male actors
Best Actor Academy Award winners
Deaths from liver cancer
Deaths from cancer in Austria